Marco Panzetti (born 1981 in Italy) is a documentary photographer, multimedia journalist and visual artist whose work focuses on the socio-environmental impact of contemporary issues related to the globalization process.

Career 
Marco Panzetti is a freelance documentary photographer, multimedia journalist and visual artist. His work focuses on the socio-environmental impact of contemporary issues related to the globalization process. With his projects, he looks into new migration paradigms, mass tourism and fast urbanization.

He carried out projects in Europe, Latin America and Asia, frequently in collaboration or on assignment for nonprofit organizations and magazines. He also works with different audiovisual formats (video, audio and VR) to create short documentary films, immersive multimedia pieces and installations.

At the beginning of his career in photography, he was apprentice to the photographer Michel Huneault and worked as his personal assistant in 2014 and 2015.

Among other publications, his work appeared in BBC News, The Times, Vice, British Red Cross, LA Times, Internazionale, New Statesman, Diari Ara, Tages-Anzeiger, and the Sydney Morning Herald.

His long-term body of work on the European migrant crisis, 'The Idea of Europe' (2015 – present) received international recognition including an Honorable Mention at the 2017 Lange-Taylor Prize and the first prize in the video category at the 2017 Migration Media Award

Awards and recognition 
 2019. Life after Hell. Finalist, Photography 4 Humanity
2019. In Between. Finalist, Festival della Fotografia Etica 2019 – Single Shot Award
2019. Out of Thin Air. Curatorial Selection, 2019 PX3 Prix de la Photographie Paris – “State of the World” category
2019. Out of Thin Air. Finalist, 2019 PhotOn Festival
2019. Life after Hell. Shortlisted, 2019 Portrait of Humanity
2019. Out of Thin Air. Honorable Mention, 2019 Focus on the Story Festival
2019. Out of Thin Air. Shortlisted, 2019 Kolga Tbilisi Photo Festival.
2018. The Idea of Europe. Semi-finalist, 2018 Lange-Taylor Prize.
2018. The Idea of Europe. Shortlisted, 2018 Premio Marco Pesaresi.
2018. The Idea of Europe. Shortlisted, 2018 Lugano Photo Days.
2018. The Idea of Europe. 2nd place, 2017 Imagely Fund Humanitarian Photography Grant.
2018. Life after Hell. Winner, 2018 Spanish National Photojournalism Award.
 2017. The Idea of Europe. Honorable Mention, 2017 Lange-Taylor Prize from Duke University (USA)
 2017. In Between. Finalist, Festival della Fotografia Etica 2017 – Single Shot Award: Solidarietà Fertile.
 2017. In Between. Shortlisted, 2017 Felix Schoeller Award
 2017. In Between. First Prize Winner, 2017 Migration Media Awards – Video category
 2017. In Between. Shortlisted. 2017 Athens Photo Festival.
 2016. In Between. Contest Winner. 'Closer 2016 – Dentro il reportage' by Witness Journal
 2016. We are not going back. Shortlisted. 2016 Athens Photo Festival.
 2015. We are not going back. Selected. 2015 Visa pour l'Image Festival – ANI's Coup de Coeur section.

Exhibitions 
 2020. Corsica. #blueborder exhibition. Coco Velten, Marseille, France (group)
2019. Life after Hell. Photography 4 Humanity. United Nations Headquarters, New York City, USA (group)
2019. In Between. Festival della Fotografia Etica 2019. Lodi, Italy (group)
2019. Out of Thin Air. PX3 Prix de la Photographie Paris – “State of the World” exhibition. Espace Beaurepaire, Paris, France (group)
2019. In Between. SOS Méditerranée/City of Geneva Exhibition. Quai Wilson, Geneva, Switzerland (group)
2018. The Idea of Europe. Assises Internationales du Journalisme. Théâtre du 4e Art, Tunis, Tunisia (solo)
2018. Life after Hell. International Peace Day. Sant Boi de Llobregat – Barcelona, Spain (solo)
2017. In Between. Festival della Fotografia Etica 2017 – Single Shot Award: Solidarietà Fertile. Lodi, Italy (group)
 2017. Mediterranean Dispatches (from In Between). Festival della Fotografia Etica 2017 – OFF Section. Lodi, Italy (group)
 2017. In Between. 2017 Photogenic Festival. Barcelona, Spain (solo)
 2017. In Between. Félix Houphouët-Boigny Peace Prize for SOS Méditerranée. UNESCO building, Paris, France (group)
 2017. In Between. Mediterraneo Downtown Festival. Logge del Palazzo Comunale, Prato, Italy (group)
 2017. In Between. IsoLab, Taranto, Italy (solo)
 2017. In Between. Arsenale della Marina Regia, Palermo, Italy (group)
 2017. In Between. QR Photogallery, Bologna, Italy (group)
 2016. We are not going back. Pati Llimona, Barcelona, Spain (solo)

References

External links 
 Marco Panzetti's personal website

1981 births
Living people
Italian photographers